PK-83 Nowshera-I is a constituency for the Khyber Pakhtunkhwa Assembly of the Khyber Pakhtunkhwa province of Pakistan.

See also
 PK-82 Peshawar-XIV
 PK-84 Nowshera-II

References

External links 
 Election Commission of Pakistan's official website

Khyber Pakhtunkhwa Assembly constituencies